Biga is a heavily Papuan-influenced Austronesian language spoken in Southwest Papua, Indonesia in the south of the island of Misool. It is spoken in the single village of Biga in Misol Timur Selatan District.

References

External links 
 Paradisec open access collection of George Grace's manuscripts from the University of Hawai'i.

South Halmahera–West New Guinea languages
Languages of western New Guinea